The 1911–12 Southern Football League season was the 18th in the history of the Southern League. Queens Park Rangers won their second league championship (the first being in 1907–08), but no clubs applied to join the Football League. Luton Town, who finished second bottom of Division One were relegated to Division Two, whilst Leyton, who finished bottom, left the Southern League after 7 seasons of participation to join the South Essex League.

Merthyr Town won the Division Two championship and were promoted to Division One together with runners-up Portsmouth, who returned to Division One after one season of absence. Walsall, who also played in the Birmingham & District League, left the Southern League, but continued to play in the Birmingham & District League. Kettering also left the Southern League along with Cwm Albion and Chesham Town, who became a founder member of the Athenian League.

Division One

A total of 20 teams contest the division, including 18 sides from previous season and two new teams.

Teams promoted from 1910–11 Division Two:
 Reading - league champions
 Stoke - league runners-up

Division Two
</onlyinclude>
A total of 14 teams contest the division, including 9 sides from previous season, two teams relegated from Division One and three new teams.

Teams relegated from 1910–11 Division One:
 Portsmouth
 Southend United
Newly elected teams:
 Cwm Albion
 Mardy
 Pontypridd

External links
Southern League First Division Tables at RSSSF
Southern League Second Division Tables at RSSSF
Football Club History Database

1911-12
1911–12 in English association football leagues
1911–12 in Welsh football